Shah Muhammad Hasanuzzaman (died 10 October 2011) was a Bangladeshi agriculturalist. He received Independence Day Award in 1978 by the Government of Bangladesh.

References

1920s births
2011 deaths
Bangladeshi scientists
Recipients of the Independence Day Award
Place of birth missing
Date of birth missing